Suarez: The Healing Priest is a 2020 Philippine biographical film directed by Joven Tan. The film depicts the life of Filipino priest and faith healer Fernando Suarez. It is one of the official entries for the 2020 Metro Manila Film Festival.

Cast
John Arcilla as Fr. Fernando 'Ado' Suarez
Jin Macapagal as young Ado
Fernando Suarez as himself
Dante Rivero as Bishop Antonio Palang
Troy Montero as Fr. Jeff Shannon
Marlo Mortel as Robert
Alice Dixson as Alice Marcelino
Rosanna Roces and Allan Paule as Noel's parents
Jairus Aquino as Noel
Joonee Gamboa and Noel Trinidad as Suarez's critic bishops
Leo Martinez and Jon Achaval as Suarez's supporter bishops
Richard Quan as Cervando Suarez
Rita Avila as Azucena Suarez
Jenine Desiderio as Ado's godmother
Perla Bautista as mysterious candle vendor
Also guests are Bobby Andrews, Gina Parreño, Menggie Cobarrubias, Christian Vasquez, Marissa Sanchez, Rubi Rubi, Michelle Vito, Buboy Villar, Andrea del Rosario, Lui Manansala, Lou Veloso, Yñigo Delen, Yayo Aguila, Dexter Doria, Archi Adamos, and Glenda Garcia, among others.

Production
Several directors and producers has been involved in a biographical film project about Filipino priest and faith healer Fernando Suarez. The final film entitled Suarez: The Healing Priest was directed by Joven Tan. Suarez personally requested John Arcilla to portray him in the film. Portions of film was shot at the foot of the Taal Volcano shortly prior to its eruption in January 2020.

Suarez himself also was involved in the filming, including in one scene where he led a "digital healing segment". Suarez died on February 4, 2020. By that time, the film was almost complete.

Release
The film will be released via online streaming platform UpStream starting December 25, 2020, as one of the ten official entries of the 2020 Metro Manila Film Festival.

Reception 
Suarez: The Healing Priest garnered nine nominations but only won the Gatpuno Antonio J. Villegas Cultural Award at the awards night of the 2020 Metro Manila Film Festival.

Critic's response are also lukewarm. Fred Hawson gave the movie a 5/10 and noted that it was "a pleasant watch overall, but a little too earnest, too defensive, too idealistic." Oggs Cruz of Rappler called the film "awful" and criticized the director for the "haphazardly crafted" outcome, but praised Arcilla for his "sophisticated" performance. Neil Ramos, in his review in Manila Bulletin, is more sympathetic of the film, calling it "a poignant look into the man’s life."

References

Philippine biographical films
Films not released in theaters due to the COVID-19 pandemic
2020 films
2020s biographical films
Films directed by Joven Tan
Films about faith healing